66th National Board of Review Awards

Best Picture (tie): 
 Forrest Gump &Pulp Fiction 
The 66th National Board of Review Awards, honoring the best in filmmaking in 1994, were announced on 14 December 1994 and given on 27 February 1995.

Top 10 films
Forrest Gump/Pulp Fiction
Quiz Show
Four Weddings and a Funeral
Bullets over Broadway
Ed Wood
The Shawshank Redemption
Nobody's Fool
The Madness of King George
Tom & Viv
Heavenly Creatures

Top Foreign Films
Eat Drink Man Woman
To Live
Strawberry and Chocolate
Three Colors: Red
Queen Margot

Winners
Best Picture (tie):
Forrest Gump
Pulp Fiction
Best Foreign Film:
Eat Drink Man Woman
Best Actor:
Tom Hanks - Forrest Gump
Best Actress:
Miranda Richardson - Tom & Viv
Best Supporting Actor:
Gary Sinise - Forrest Gump
Best Supporting Actress:
Rosemary Harris - Tom & Viv
Best Acting by an Ensemble:
Pret a Porter
Best Director:
Quentin Tarantino - Pulp Fiction
Best Screenplay:
William Goldman - Career Achievement
Best Documentary:
Hoop Dreams
Best Film made for Cable TV
Tales of the City
Career Achievement Award:
Sidney Poitier
Billy Wilder Award for Excellence in Directing:
Billy Wilder
William K. Everson Award for Film History
William K. Everson
Special Citation:
James Card, for outstanding film preservation

External links
National Board of Review of Motion Pictures :: Awards for 1994

1994
1994 film awards
1994 in American cinema